GIPC PDZ domain containing family, member 1 (GIPC1) is a protein that in humans is encoded by the GIPC1 gene. GIPC was originally identified as it binds specifically to the C terminus of RGS-GAIP, a protein involved in the regulation of G protein signaling. GIPC is an acronym for "GAIP Interacting Protein C-terminus". RGS proteins are "Regulators of G protein Signaling" and RGS-GAIP is a "GTPase Activator protein for Gαi/Gαq", which are two major subtypes of Gα proteins. The human GIPC1 molecule is 333 amino acids or about 36 kDa in molecular size and consists of a central PDZ domain, a compact protein module which mediates specific protein-protein interactions. The RGS-GAIP protein interacts with this domain and many other proteins interact here or at other parts of the GIPC1 molecule. As a result, GIPC1 was independently discovered by several other groups and has a variety of alternate names, including synectin, C19orf3, RGS19IP1 and others. The GIPC1 gene family in mammals consisting of three members, so the first discovered, originally named GIPC, is now generally called GIPC1, with the other two being named GIPC2 and GIPC3. The three human proteins are about 60% identical in protein sequence. GIPC1 has been shown to interact with a variety of other receptor and cytoskeletal proteins including the GLUT1 receptor, ACTN1, KIF1B, MYO6, PLEKHG5, SDC4/syndecan-4, SEMA4C/semaphorin-4 and HTLV-I Tax. The general function of GIPC family proteins therefore appears to be mediating specific interactions between proteins involved in G protein signaling and membrane translocation.

Interactions 

GIPC1 has been shown to interact with:

 Actinin, alpha 1, 
 ADRB1, 
 GLUT1, 
 ITGA5, 
 ITGA6, 
 KIF1B, 
 LRP1, 
 LRP2, 
 LHCGR, 
 MYO6,
 RGS19, 
 TPBG,  and
 TYRP1.

See also 
GIPC PDZ domain containing family, member 2, GIPC2

GIPC PDZ domain containing family, member 3, GIPC3

References

Further reading